Solyom is a surname. Notable people with the surname include:

László Sólyom (born 1942), Hungarian politician, lawyer, and librarian
Stefan Solyom (born 1979), Swedish conductor and composer

See also
Sólyom Hungarian Airways, an airline founded 2013

Hungarian-language surnames
Surnames from nicknames